The Star Awards for Best Rising Star is an award presented annually at the Star Awards, a ceremony that was established in 1994.

The category was introduced in 1994, at the 1st Star Awards ceremony as two separate awards; Yao Wenlong received the award as the Most Popular Male Newcomer award while Ivy Lee received the Most Popular Female Newcomer award and both were given in honour of a MediaCorp male and female newcomer who were deemed the most popular among the television audience. The nominees are determined by a team of judges employed by MediaCorp; winners are selected by a majority vote from the public via telephone and SMS text voting. Between 1995 and 2006, the category eliminated the distinctions between male and female newcomers and was given as a single award under the name of Most Popular Newcomer.

From 2007, the award went through a major revamp and was renamed as Best Newcomer. It was changed from being a popularity award to a professional award, and is given in honour of a MediaCorp newcomer who has delivered an outstanding performance in their field of profession. Similar to the Most Popular Newcomer award, the nominees are determined by a team of judges employed by MediaCorp; but the winners are selected by a majority vote from the entire judging panel. Pornsak is the first winner of the newly revamped category.

The nominees for this award were selected without any reference to their respective work titles – with the exception of 1995, 1998, 1999, 2012, 2013, 2018, 2019 and 2021 when the newcomers were nominated together with the work titles which establish the public identity of the newcomers thereafter.

The award was not presented in 2003, 2010, 2011, 2014, 2016, 2017, and 2022 due to the lack of eligible nominees.

Since its inception, the award has been given to 21 newcomers. Zhang Ze Tong is the most recent winner in this category for his role in A Jungle Survivor.

From 2023, the award went through another revamp and was renamed as Best Rising Star. This award is similar to the Best Newcomer award, with artistes being eligible as long as they have 5 years or less of professional screen acting and/or hosting experience the year before the awards. Artistes are also eligible if they have professional screen acting and/or hosting experience (excluding cameo appearances) and/or experiences before 18 years of age. Artistes that are nominated must have performed and/or presented in at least 5 episodes of eligible programmes, and similar to the Best Newcomer, nominees that have won any popularity and/or performance awards in previous awards ceremony are no longer eligible.

Recipients

Award records

References

External links 

Star Awards